Laputa is a fictional country from the book Gulliver's Travels, by Jonathan Swift.

Laputa may also refer to:

In media and entertainment
Laputa (band), a now-disbanded Japanese rock band
Laputa (film), a 1986 German film
Laputa: Castle in the Sky, 1986 animated film by Hayao Miyazaki
Laputa Book Reader, eReader software
Laputa, a fictitious ICBM base in Dr. Strangelove (film)

In other uses
Mazda Laputa, an SUV/keicar vehicle created by Mazda